The 2021 Hartford Athletic season is the club's third season of existence and their third in the USL Championship, the second tier of American soccer.

Effects of the Covid-19 pandemic 
To start the season, Hartford Athletic will allow 50% capacity at home games at Dillon Stadium.

Starting with the home game on May 29, they will be allowed to have a full capacity at home games.

Roster

Competitions

Exhibitions

USL Championship 
Source:

See also
 Hartford Athletic
 2021 in American soccer
 2021 USL Championship season

References 

Hartford Athletic